Draba nemorosa is a species of flowering plant belonging to the family Brassicaceae.

Its native range is Subarctic and Temperate Northern Hemisphere.

References

nemorosa